Kuqa is a county-level city in Aksu Prefecture, Xinjiang Uyghur Autonomous Region, China. Other names and variants of spelling of Kuqa are Kocha, Kuchu, Kuchar, Kuchi, Kuchel, K'u-ch'e-chen, K'u-ch'e-hsien, Kuga, Kucha and K'u-ch'e. It was once the homeland of the ancient Buddhist Kingdom of Kucha.

History

According to the Book of Han (completed in 111 CE), Kucha was the largest of the "Thirty-six Kingdoms of the Western Regions", with a population of 81,317, including 21,076 persons able to bear arms.

In 630, Xuanzang (玄奘; Xuán Zàng), a well-known Chinese Buddhist monk, scholar, traveler and translator visited Kucha during the Early Tang period.

In the book "Hudud ul-'alam min al-mashriq ila al-maghrib", written in 982 by an unknown Arab or Persian writer, and presented to Abu'l Haret Muhammad, the ruler of Guzgan, the following is written regarding Kucha:

Mirza Muhammad Haidar Dughlat, a military general, in his historical book Tarikh-i-Rashidi used the word "Kūsān" for Kucha.

Mahmud Kashgari, in his Compendium of Turkic Languages (Divân-ı Lügati't-Türk), wrote the following about Kucha: "It is one of the cities built by Zülqarnayin (Alexander the Macedonian).". He also wrote that Kucha was a Uyghur town.

In 1758, the Qing Dynasty took control of the area, and the Chinese character name 'Kuche' was made the name of the area.

In 1991, there was a bombing attack at a Kuqa County government office and at an XPCC unit.

In an interview with Radio Free Asia, an officer at the Kuchar County Police Department reported that from June to December 2018, 150 people at the No. 1 Internment Camp in the Yengisher district of Kuchar county had died, corroborating earlier reports attributed to Himit Qari, former area police chief.

On December 20, 2019, Kuqa County was disestablished and Kuqa City was created.

Ancient Buddhist kingdom in Kuqa

Monasteries 
 Ta-mu had 170 priests.
 Around Che-hu-li, on a hill north of the city of Po-shan, there were 50 or 60 monks.
 Another Monastery was founded by King Wen-Su (Uch-Turfan) and had 70 monks.

Convents 
There were two convents in A-li (Avania).
 Liun-jo-kan: 50 nuns
 A-li-po: 30 nuns
Another monastery, Tsio-li, north of Kucha and a famous place where Kumārajīva's mother Jīva retreated.

Priests

Po-Yen 
Known as Po-Yen, a priest from the royal family who traveled to the Chinese capital Luoyang (Chinese simple: 洛阳; traditional: 洛陽) between 256 and 260 BC. He translated six Buddhist texts into Chinese within the year 258 BC.

Po-Po-Śrīmitra 
Po-Po-Śrīmitra is another priest from Kuqa who traveled Southern China between 307 and 312 BC and translated three Buddhist texts.

Po-Yen 
A second Buddhist priest from Kuqa, known as Po-Yen, also went to Liangzhou (present-day Wuwei district in Gansu). Although not so well known in China, he translated many texts.

Climate

Geography 
The city is located at the southern periphery of the Tian Shan range, the northern portion of the Tarim Basin, and the centre of the autonomous region. It occupies part of the northeastern portion of Aksu Prefecture, bordering Xinhe County, Xayar County, and Luntai County, Heiing County, and Lopnur County in Bayingolin Mongol Autonomous Region.

The frost-free period lasts for 266 days on average. With monthly percent possible sunshine ranging from 54% in March to 69% in September and October, sunshine is abundant and the city receives 2,712 hours of bright sunshine annually.

Administrative divisions

Kuqa has four subdistricts, eight towns, six townships and one other area under its administration:

Subdistricts ( / ):
 Reste Subdistrict (Resitan;  / ), Saqsaq Subdistrict (Sakesake;  / ), Yengisheher Subdistrict (Xincheng;  / ), Sherqiy Subdistrict (Dongcheng;  / )

Towns ( / ):
 Uchar (Wuqia;  / ), Alakaga (Alahage, Alaqagha;  / ), Chimen (Qiman;  / ), Dongqotan (Dunkuotan;  / ), Yaqa (Yaha;  / ), Uzun (Wuzun;  / ), Ishxila (Yixihala;  / ), Erbatey (Erbatai;  / )

Townships ( / ):
 Uchosteng Township (Yuqiwusitang;  / ), Biyixbag Township (Bixibage, Behishbagh;  / ), Xanqitam Township (Hanikatamu;  / ), Aqosteng Township (Akewusitang;  / ), Aghi Township (Age (pronounced ‘ah-guh’);  / ), Tarim Township (Talimu;  / )

Other areas:
 Kuqa Economic and Technological Development Zone

Economy 
Agricultural products include wheat, corn, rice, cotton as well as pears, apricots, melons, grapes, pomegranates, figs, etc. Specialty products include Sanbei Sheep lambskin, white apricots and thin-shelled walnuts. Mineral resources include oil and coal. Industries include coal mining, tractor manufacturing and repair, construction and processing for non-staple foods.

, there was about 99,200 acres (654,476 mu) of cultivated land in Kuqa.

Demographics

As of 2015, 440,125 of the 492,535 residents of Kuqa County were Uyghur, 49,021 were Han Chinese and 3,389 were from other ethnic groups.

As of 1999, 89.93% of the population of Kuqa County were Uyghur and 9.49% of the population was Han Chinese.

Transportation
Kuqa is served by China National Highway 217, China National Highway 314, the Southern Xinjiang Railway and Kuqa Qiuci Airport.

Kuqa Town

Kuqa is also the name of the central town, located in the easternmost area of Kuqa. It is the second largest town of Aksu Prefecture. Its area size is 14,528.74 square meters and population 470,600, composed of fourteen peoples including the Uyghurs, Hans, Huis, and Mongols. Kuqa is a thriving town of oil and natural gas development of the Tarim Basin, and of tourism, as it was once the homeland of the ancient Buddhist Kingdom of Kucha. Its tourist attractions are:
Kumtura Caves
Subashi Temple Ruins
Kizilgaha Caves

Notable persons
 Qurban Mamut, former editor-in-chief of the official Xinjiang Cultural Journal and detainee in the Xinjiang re-education camps

Historical maps 
Historical English-language maps including Kuqa:

Notes

References

External links 

County-level divisions of Xinjiang
Aksu Prefecture
Populated places in Xinjiang